Juan Gabriel con Mariachi Vol. II ("Juan Gabriel with Mariachi Vol. 2") is the seventh studio album by Mexican singer-songwriter Juan Gabriel, originally released in 1976 and re-released on July 30, 1996. In this album, Juan Gabriel performs with Mariachi Mexico 70 de Pepe Lopez.

Track listing

References

External links 
Official Juan Gabriel website
Amazon.com: Juan Gabriel con Mariachi Vol. II
[  Allmusic.com: Juan Gabriel con Mariachi Vol. II]

Juan Gabriel albums
Mariachi albums
1976 albums
RCA Records albums
Spanish-language albums